Skidbrooke, also called Skidbrooke cum Saltfleet, is a hamlet in the East Lindsey district of Lincolnshire, England. With the hamlet of Saltfleet Haven it forms the civil parish of Skidbrooke with Saltfleet Haven.

In 1066 Queen Edith was Lord of the Manor, which in 1086 was transferred to William I.

The parish church is dedicated to Saint Botolph. Now closed, it is cared for by the Churches Conservation Trust.

There is a Grade II listed limestone pump in the village, which is a memorial to Frederick Allen Freshney of South Somercotes, who died in May 1906 from wounds received in the Boer War.

The New Inn is a Grade II listed red-brick public house dating from the 17th century, with 18th- and 19th-century additions.

The Manor House, which dates from about 1673 with 19th-century additions, is a Grade II listed red-brick house.

Skidbrooke Grade II listed tower windmill dates from about 1770. It originally had three pairs of stones. In the late 1890s it was rebuilt gaining extra storeys, a new cap and fantail and four patent sails. It continued to work until about 1951.

References

External links

Hamlets in Lincolnshire
Civil parishes in Lincolnshire
East Lindsey District